Mark E. Peeples is an American biologist, focusing on protein structure and folding, and the molecular basis of disease and virology. He is doing research on RSV infection.
He is currently at The Research Institute at Nationwide Children's Hospital and Ohio State University and is an Elected Fellow of the American Association for the Advancement of Science.

References 

1952 births
Living people
Fellows of the American Association for the Advancement of Science
Ohio State University faculty
21st-century American biologists